N'Dayi Kalenga  (born 29 September 1978 in Kamina) is a DR Congolese professional football striker who currently plays for Msida St. Joseph in Malta.
He has previously played for several other Maltese clubs, including Mosta F.C.

References

External links
 
 
 Profile at MostaFC.com
 

1978 births
Living people
Democratic Republic of the Congo footballers
Democratic Republic of the Congo expatriate footballers
Kayserispor footballers
Kardemir Karabükspor footballers
Göztepe S.K. footballers
Pogoń Szczecin players
Għajnsielem F.C. players
Democratic Republic of the Congo expatriate sportspeople in Turkey
Mosta F.C. players
Süper Lig players
Ekstraklasa players
Seongnam FC players
K League 1 players
Expatriate footballers in Northern Cyprus
Association football forwards
Expatriate footballers in Turkey
Expatriate footballers in Poland
Expatriate footballers in South Korea
Expatriate footballers in Malta
Expatriate footballers in Oman
Democratic Republic of the Congo expatriate sportspeople in South Korea
Democratic Republic of the Congo expatriate sportspeople in Poland
Democratic Republic of the Congo expatriate sportspeople in Cyprus
Democratic Republic of the Congo expatriate sportspeople in Malta
Democratic Republic of the Congo expatriate sportspeople in Oman